CARTS is an abbreviation that may refer to:

 Capital Area Rural Transportation System
 Chautauqua Area Rural Transit System